The men's 15 kilometre classical cross-country skiing competition at the 2002 Winter Olympics in Salt Lake City, United States, was held on 12 February at Soldier Hollow.

Each skier started at half a minute intervals, skiing the entire 15 kilometre course. Per Elofsson was the 2001 World champion. The defending Olympic champion was the Norwegian Thomas Alsgaard, who won in Nagano, but the 15 kilometre event was held as a pursuit.

Results

References

Men's cross-country skiing at the 2002 Winter Olympics
Men's 15 kilometre cross-country skiing at the Winter Olympics